Greg Weeks is an American singer-songwriter based in Philadelphia. His music has been described as folk, acoustic, psychedelic and experimental. He is best known as a founding member of the psychedelic folk-rock band Espers. Weeks has released four solo albums and has guest-recorded with many artists, including Fern Knight and Marissa Nadler.  He is also a member of The Valerie Project.

In 2007, he founded the record label Language of Stone, an imprint of Drag City, along with his wife Jessica Weeks.

His song "Made" was featured in Weeds as well as the "Pink" adicolor video, which was directed by Charlie White.

Now, however, he teaches the subject of English at Muhlenberg High School.

Discography

Solo

Albums
Fire in the Arms of the Sun (self-released CD, 1997)
Fire in the Arms of the Sun (reissue CD Ba da Bing!, February 15, 1999)
Awake Like Sleep (CD Ba da Bing!, October 2, 2001)
Blood is Trouble (CD Ba da Bing!, January 2005)
The Hive (CD Wichita Recordings, November 3, 2008)

EPs
Bleecker Station (CD Keyhole Records, 2000)
Slightly West (CD Acuarela Discos, 2002)
Train in Vein: Bleecker-Era Outtakes (ltd. ed. numbered CD-R hinah, 2004)

Espers
Espers (CD Locust Music, January 20, 2004; ltd. ed. LP of 300 copies by Time Lag, 2004; CD and ltd. LP Wichita Recordings, August 15, 2005)
The Weed Tree (LP/CD Locust Music, October 4, 2005)
Espers II (LP/CD Drag City, March 16, 2006)
Espers III (LP/CD Drag City, October 20, 2009)

The Valerie Project
The Valerie Project (2LP/CD Drag City, November 20, 2007)

Mountain Home
Mountain Home (album) (CD Language of Stone, September 25, 2007)

References

External links
Language of Stone 

2009 interview
hinah
2002 interview
Review with link to "Pink" viral ad with "Made" (Awake Like Sleep) remix soundtrack

Psychedelic folk musicians
Living people
Freak folk
Wichita Recordings artists
Year of birth missing (living people)
Espers (band) members
The Valerie Project members